Verkhatoy (Vorxatha)  is a rural locality (a selo) in Vedensky District, Chechnya.

Administrative and municipal status 
Municipally, Verkhatoy is incorporated into Tsa-Vedenskoye rural settlement. It is one of three settlements included in it.

Geography 

Verkhatoy is located between the Elistanzhi and Khulkhulau rivers.

The nearest settlements to Verkhatoy are Benoy in the north, Guni and Khadzhi-Yurt in the north-east, Tsa-Vedeno and Verkhny Tsa-Vedeno in the south-east, Eshilkhatoy and Elistanzhi in the south, and Khattuni in the south-west.

History 
In 1944, after the genocide and deportation of the Chechen and Ingush people and the Chechen-Ingush ASSR was abolished, the village of Verkhatoy was renamed, and settled by people from the neighboring republic of Dagestan. From 1944 to 1958, it was a part of the Vedensky District of the Dagestan ASSR.

In 1958, after the Vaynakh people returned and the Chechen-Ingush ASSR was restored, the village regained its old Chechen name, Verkhatoy.

Population 
 2002 Census: 465
 2010 Census: 971
 2019 estimate: ?

According to the 2010 Census, the majority of residents of Verkhatoy were ethnic Chechens.

References 

Rural localities in Vedensky District